The Union Implement and Hardware Building is a historic building in Independence, Kansas.  Constructed in from 1900, it was listed on the National Register of Historic Places in 1988.

The building was a joint venture by the Union Implement and Hardware Company (a seller of agricultural implements).  and Fortitude Lodge No. 107 (a local Masonic Lodge).  The company's showrooms and offices occupied the first and second floor, while the lodge occupied the third and fourth floors.  Union Implement went out of business in 1930, and the lodge moved to new premises in 1957.

References

Buildings and structures in Montgomery County, Kansas
Clubhouses on the National Register of Historic Places in Kansas
Romanesque Revival architecture in Kansas
Commercial buildings completed in 1900
Commercial buildings on the National Register of Historic Places in Kansas
Masonic buildings completed in 1900
Former Masonic buildings in Kansas
National Register of Historic Places in Montgomery County, Kansas
Independence, Kansas